Daniel Campbell Smith (born 14 July 1986) is an English singer, songwriter and record producer, best known as the founder, lead singer and primary songwriter of the English pop rock band Bastille. The band formed in 2010 and gained mass popularity in 2013 when the song "Pompeii" was released with their album Bad Blood. The band then released their second album, Wild World in September 2016. In June 2019, the band released their third album Doom Days.

Career
Smith attended King's College School and the University of Leeds in Leeds, West Yorkshire, where he graduated with a degree in English Language and Literature while also writing about film and music for the Leeds student newspaper. A film obsessive from a young age, he originally wanted to be a director or editor until admitting he was "more of a fan than a filmmaker".

At age fifteen, Smith started writing songs on the piano and his laptop in his bedroom, but kept his music secret from his friends and family until he was persuaded by a friend to enter the Leeds Bright Young Things competition in 2007, which he ultimately became a finalist in. His early recordings included "Alchemy", "Words Are Words", "Irreverence", and "Dictator". Smith did not achieve mainstream success in his solo career but continued writing songs both alone and with his close friend and roommate Ralph Pelleymounter of the band To Kill a King. The two formed a side project called "Annie Oakley Hanging" which was described as "cowboy-like" by Pelleymounter.

After finishing his studies, Smith returned to London, where he continued pursuing his solo career, and eventually formed Bastille with Chris "Woody" Wood, Kyle Simmons, and Will Farquarson. Bastille has released four albums called Bad Blood, Wild World, Doom Days and Give Me The Future, the latest of which was released 4 February 2022.

In 2014, Dan Smith took part in the Band Aid charity single, "Do They Know It's Christmas?".

In 2015, Smith featured as vocalist for the song "La Lune," produced and written by the French electronic musician Madeon for Madeon's 2015 album Adventure. In the same year, Smith co-wrote and provided vocals on "Better Love" with Foxes, which was released 4 September 2015.

In 2017, he participated in the Grenfell Tower charity song, "Bridge Over Troubled Water".

Smith was part of the music video for the Charli XCX single 'Boys' which was released on 26 July 2017.

He featured in the December 2017 ITV programme of The Nation's Favourite series which found out the nation's favourite Elton John song. 

At the 2019 Brit Awards, Smith performed a duet with American artist, Pink, of her song, "Just Give Me a Reason", as part of her medley performance.

In November 2019, a cover of the REO Speedwagon song "Can't Fight This Feeling" sung by Smith was used in the John Lewis & Partners 2019 Christmas advert.

Influences
Smith is a fan of the TV series Twin Peaks, and of one of its creators, David Lynch. The show inspired one of his first recorded songs, "Laura Palmer" and Bastille's first Virgin Records single "Overjoyed". Smith has said that his earlier work was influenced by Regina Spektor.

Personal life
Smith writes and arranges some of Bastille's songs, apart from remixes and covers, and worked with friend Mark Crew to produce Bad Blood and Wild World. He plays the piano, keyboard, percussion, and melodica. His original, "Dan Smith Piano" was stolen in 2010.
Smith's parents are South African lawyers who met at university.

During the COVID-19 pandemic in 2020, Smith performed music live on Instagram, and also set up a film club named 'Distraction Tactics', inspired by different countries around the world; each week the club visits a different country and film. Its aim is to provide distraction and happiness to those in need of some relief from social distancing and isolation.

Songwriting credits

References

Living people
English people of South African descent
21st-century English singers
Electropop musicians
English male singers
Virgin Records artists
Musicians from London
Bastille (band) members
1986 births
People educated at King's College School, London
Alumni of the University of Leeds